The Lower Inn Valley Railway is a two-track, electrified railway line that is one of the major lines of the Austrian railways. It was originally opened as the k.k. Nordtiroler Staatsbahn (Imperial and Royal North Tyrolean State Railway). It begins at the German border near the Austrian city of Kufstein as a continuation of the Rosenheim–Kufstein line and runs in a generally south-westerly direction through Tyrol along the Inn valley to Innsbruck. The line is part of the Line 1 of Trans-European Transport Networks (TEN-T). The line is owned and operated by Austrian Federal Railways (ÖBB).

History

Emperor Franz Joseph I of Austria had ordered its construction in 1853. The line was the first railway in western Austria, opened on 24 November 1858.

New line

In order to increase the capacity of the track and in preparation for the construction of the Brenner Base Tunnel a new high-capacity line has been built between Kundl1 junction and Fritzen-Wattens 1 junction (at Baumkirchen). It was opened on 9 December 2012 for scheduled traffic. The great majority of this line has been built in tunnel in order not to increase noise pollution in the Inn valley. An extension of the new line from Kundl/Radfeld to Brannenburg is in the planning phase.

References

Railway lines in Austria
Railway lines opened in 1858
Buildings and structures in Tyrol (state)